Elections were held on Thursday, 4 May 1995, with one third of the seats set for re-election, with an extra vacancy in Leigh East. Ahead of this election Labour had gained the seat being fought in Beech Hill from the Liberal Democrats, and defended a seat in Worsley Mesnes in by-elections. The major parties marginally increased their number of candidates upon last year's totals, whereas the number of Independent Labour candidates fighting returned to just the incumbent in Hindley. Having been the only party opposing Labour in Atherton, the Independent Labour absence there meant that went uncontested this time round, alongside two of last year's unopposed wards, Ince and Leigh Central. In total unopposed wards were reduced from the previous year's four to three. Turnout fell to 26.4%, the second lowest in the council's history, only surpassing the 1992 nadir.

The election seen mixed fortunes for the main parties. For the Conservatives, this was undoubtedly their worst performance, with the lowest vote share (and at 10.2%, very close to dropping into single-digits) and vote figure obtained in their 22-year history of contesting for this council. Despite receiving near-two thousand fewer votes from the election the year before, Labour, however, beat the record share they'd recorded then, capturing 72.8% of votes cast. The Lib Dem vote fell further into the four-digit territory seen recently in their tumultuous merger period, but unlike then managed to stay within mid-teens in vote share.

With such an overwhelming vote, Labour captured every seat except the Independent Labour-held Hindley, making a total of four gains, and securing the largest majority since 1973. All but one were at the Lib Dem's expense, with their incumbent in Aspull-Standish standing for his third term ousted, their seat in Bedford-Astley fought and won by their previous incumbent for Labour and being reduced to one in the increasingly marginal, but one-time stronghold, ward of Langtree. The Conservatives suffered a loss to Labour in their only remaining favourable territory of Swinley, reducing their representation to an all-time low of one in both ward and council. The sole non-Labour victor in Hindley, standing under the title as Real Labour, seen her majority reduced.

Election result

This result had the following consequences for the total number of seats on the Council after the elections:

Ward results

References

1995 English local elections
1995
1990s in Greater Manchester